The following Confederate States Army units and commanders fought in Virginia's Battle of Chancellorsville, which lasted from April 30 to May 6, 1863, during the American Civil War. The Union order of battle is listed separately. Order of battle has been compiled from the army organization during the campaign, the casualty returns and the reports.

Abbreviations used

Military rank
 Gen = General
 LTG = Lieutenant General
 MG = Major General
 BG = Brigadier General
 Col = Colonel
 Ltc = Lieutenant Colonel
 Maj = Major
 Cpt = Captain
 Lt = Lieutenant

Other
 (w) = wounded
 (mw) = mortally wounded
 (k) = killed in action
 (c) = captured

Army of Northern Virginia

Gen Robert E. Lee

First Corps

Gen Robert E. Lee

Chief of Artillery: Col James B. Walton

Second Corps

LTG Thomas J. Jackson (mw)

MG Ambrose P. Hill (w)

BG Robert E. Rodes

MG J. E. B. Stuart

Chief of Artillery: Col Stapleton Crutchfield (w), Col E. Porter Alexander, Col J. Thompson Brown

Army Reserve Artillery

Cavalry

Notes

References
 Sears, Stephen W. Chancellorsville. Boston: Houghton Mifflin, 1996. .
 U.S. War Department, The War of the Rebellion: a Compilation of the Official Records of the Union and Confederate Armies, U.S. Government Printing Office, 1880–1901.

American Civil War orders of battle